Dola is a census-designated place in central Washington Township, Hardin County, Ohio, United States. As of the 2010 United States Census it had a population of 140. It has a post office with the ZIP code 45835.

History
Dola was originally called "North Washington", and under the latter name was platted in 1852. A post office was established as "North Washington" in 1854, and the name was changed to "Dola" in 1906.

Geography
Dola is located along State Route 81 between Ada and Dunkirk,  by road north-northwest of the city of Kenton, the county seat of Hardin County.  Dola lies at the headwaters of the Eagle Creek, which flows north to meet the Blanchard River in Findlay.

Demographics

Education

References

Census-designated places in Ohio
Census-designated places in Hardin County, Ohio
1852 establishments in Ohio
Populated places established in 1852